Kimberley Road is a road in Tsim Sha Tsui, Kowloon, Hong Kong.

Location
Starting at Nathan Road in the west, it runs eastwards until Observatory Road and continues northeastwards. The Road runs parallel to and north of Kimberley Street, Cameron Road and Granville Road.

Name 
The road first appeared on the Rates List for 1897/8. John Wodehouse, 1st Earl of Kimberley gave his name to this road. He was a Secretary of State for the Colonies from July 1870 to February 1874 and served under the Prime Minister William Ewart Gladstone. In 1905, the road was extended from Observatory Road to Austin Road.

Features 
 Mira Place, located at No. 32 Nathan Road, at the corner of Kimberley Road
 The Mira Hong Kong, located at No. 118 Nathan Road, at the corner of Kimberley Road
 Kimberley Hotel, at No. 28 Kimberley Road
 Empire Hotel Kowloon, at No. 62 Kimberley Road, at the corner with Observatory Road

Kimberley Street

Kimberley Street is a shorter street that runs parallel to Kimberley Road and Granville Road, between Observatory Road and Carnarvon Road. It is famous for its Korean restaurants and grocery stores, especially after the advent of the Korean Wave in Hong Kong. A Koreatown, the street is known locally by the nicknames "Korean Street" and "Little Korea".

See also
 List of streets and roads in Hong Kong

References

Roads in Kowloon
Tsim Sha Tsui